Demetrida depressa is a species of ground beetle in Lebiinae subfamily. It was described by Perroud and Montrouzier in 1864 and is endemic to New Caledonia.

References

Beetles described in 1864
Insects of New Caledonia
depressa